Christian de Walden (born September 12, 1946) is a record producer, composer, arranger and songwriter of Italian origin, who currently resides in Los Angeles, California. He produced hits for Amanda Lear, Audrey Landers, Bonnie Bianco, Anne Murray, Brigitte Nielsen, Engelbert Humperdinck, Michael Holm, Thomas Anders, Marta Sánchez, The Three Degrees, Cheap Trick, Bad English, XLR8, Charlie Green, Lorena Herrera, Sarah Geronimo, Vanna Vanna and others.

In 2003 Christian de Walden was honored by the BMI Latin Award as a songwriter of "Yo No Soy Esa Mujer", recorded by the Latin Grammy nominee Paulina Rubio.

Selected Hit records

 “How Deep Is Your Love” by Thomas Anders (1992, #71 Germany)
 “Standing Alone” by Thomas Anders & Glenn Medeiros (1992, #72 Germany)
 “When Will I See You Again” by Thomas Anders & The Three Degrees (1993, #37 Germany)
 “I'll Love You Forever” by Thomas Anders (1993, #79 Germany)
 “Desesperada” by Marta Sánchez (1994, #10 Billboard Hot Latin Tracks)
 “De Mujer A Mujer” by Marta Sánchez (1994, #22 Billboard Hot Latin Tracks)
 “Luna De Plata (My One And Only)” by Kiara (1995, #26 Billboard Hot Latin Tracks)
 “Dime La Verdad” by Marta Sánchez (1995, #9 Billboard Hot Latin Tracks)
 “Arena Y Sol” by Marta Sánchez (1995, #20 Billboard Hot Latin Tracks)
 “La Belleza” by Marta Sánchez (1996, #26 Billboard Hot Latin Tracks)
 “No More Turning Back” by Gitta (2000, #63 Holland)

References

External links
 BMI.com
 Taka Boom page
 Vanna Vanna page
 Rachelle Ann page

Italian film score composers
Italian male film score composers
Italian record producers
Italian songwriters
Male songwriters
Italian dance musicians
Living people
1946 births
Place of birth missing (living people)